Gugsa is a male name of Ethiopian origin. It may refer to:

 Gugsa Araya Selassie
 Gugsa of Yejju
 Gugsa Welle
Gugsa Wale's rebellion
 Haile Selassie Gugsa
 Shimeket Gugesa (Shimeket Gugsa)

Ethiopian given names